Kim Bok-rae (born 3 May 1977) is a South Korean table tennis player. She competed in women's doubles at the 2004 Summer Olympics in Athens, placing fourth.

References

External links

1977 births
Living people
South Korean female table tennis players
Olympic table tennis players of South Korea
Table tennis players at the 2004 Summer Olympics
21st-century South Korean women